Acacia scalena is a shrub of the genus Acacia and the subgenus Phyllodineae that is endemic to a small area in western Australia.

Description
The glabrous, short, rigid and straight branchlets are patent to ascending are often spinose and lightly covered in a fine white powdery coating. Like many species it has phyllodes rather than new leaves. It blooms from June to September and produces yellow flowers. The rudimentary inflorescences occur singly on racemes with a length of around  the spherical flower-heads contain 18 to 22 golden coloured flowers.

Distribution
It is native to an area in the Wheatbelt and Mid West regions of Western Australia where it is found growing in yellow coloured sandy or loamy soils. The range of the plant extends from around Ballidu in the south to around Latham in the north where it is usually found as a part of Eucalyptus woodland or open heath communities.

See also
 List of Acacia species

References

scalena
Acacias of Western Australia
Taxa named by Bruce Maslin
Plants described in 1997